In the Library is a 1894–1900 oil painting on canvas by John F. Peto.

References

Paintings in the collection of the Timken Museum of Art